Novokasmartsky (Yañı Qaśmart) is a rural locality (a village) in Baishevsky Selsoviet, Zianchurinsky District, Bashkortostan, Russia. The population was 6 as of 2010. There is 1 street.

Geography 
Novokasmartsky is located 86 km southeast of Isyangulovo (the district's administrative centre) by road. Idelbakovo is the nearest rural locality.

References 

Rural localities in Zianchurinsky District